Choreia is a circle dance accompanied by singing (see Greek chorus, choros), in ancient Greece. Homer refers to this dance in his epic poem, the Iliad.

Cognates of choreia are used for circle dances in a number of other countries:

 horon, in Turkey
 khorovod (коровод), in Russia
 khora (хора), in Ukraine
 hora, in Romania and Moldova
 horo (хоро), in Bulgaria
 oro (оро), in North Macedonia and Montenegro
 kolo (коло), in Bosnia, Croatia and Serbia
  (кола), in Belarus
 valle, in Albania

See also 
 Rasa lila
 Greek dance
 Tanabata

References

 Calame, Claude. 2001. Choruses of Young Women in Ancient Greece: Their Morphology, Religious Role, and Social Functions. Trans. Derek Collins and Janice Orion. Rev. ed. Lanham: Rowman & Littlefield. .
 Ley, Graham. 2007. The Theatricality of Greek Tragedy: Playing Space and Chorus. Chicago and London: U of Chicago P. .

Ancient Greek dances
Ancient Greek theatre
Circle dances